Zenay Jordaan (born 31 April 1991) is a South African rugby union player. She plays for EP Queens and the South Africa women's national rugby union team. 

In 2009, she made her international debut in both sevens and 15s, and five years later she was part of the first group of South African women to be awarded professional contracts. In 2013 she was named Springbok Women's Player of the Year, and in 2022 she became South Africa's most capped player. At that time, she also announced her plans to retire after the 2022 World Cup.

References 

Living people
1991 births
Female rugby sevens players
South African female rugby union players
South Africa international women's rugby sevens players
Rugby union players from the Eastern Cape